Australian Screen Editors (ASE) was founded in 1996 by Henry Dangar (who became its first president) and Jenny Ward. The guild is "dedicated to the pursuit and recognition of excellence in the arts, sciences and technology of motion picture and televisual post production. It aims to promote, improve and protect the role of editor as an essential and significant contributor to all screen productions."

The current President of ASE is Fiona Strain. Immediate past presidents include Deborah Peart, Dany Cooper, Jason Ballantine, Karen Pearlman, Lindi Harrison and Peter Whitmore. It currently has about 500 members in all Australian states, predominantly in NSW and Victoria.

Membership 
Applications for ASE membership are invited from professional screen editors, assistant editors, students of screen editing and associated film industry professionals. Applicants must have a folio of significant editorial work in film and/or television. There are three types of memberships: Full members, associate members and student members. Some notable members such as Jill Bilcock are members of both the Australian Screen Editors and American Cinema Editors. Members are not permitted to use the acronym "ASE" after their names on screen credits until they obtain ASE accreditation.

Accreditation 
ASE accreditation is like an honorary degree given to members who have made a significant contribution to editing. There are currently 46 accredited members. Accreditation is presented at the annual ASE awards night and are given under the following guidelines.

It is an acknowledgement of a very strong body of work over a period of time.
It is given by editing peers and therefore has a high value attached to it.
It is an acknowledgement of an editor who has continued to pass on the craft of editing to those who want to learn.
It is an acknowledgement of an editor who has continued to work actively in promoting the values of good editing and editing practices.

Guild structure 
The ASE has an executive committee based in Sydney (New South Wales) and sub committees in Melbourne (Victoria), Brisbane (Queensland),Perth (Western Australia) and Adelaide (South Australia), who meet monthly to discuss issues and organise events such as talks by industry professionals, technical events and screenings.

Resources 
ASE owns and operates both "Editsearch", an online based bulletin board for ASE members providing information on editorial related jobs, and a mentor scheme, where younger or less experienced members can gain work experience with senior industry professionals. In addition, ASE also provides a wealth of resources such as an online forum, technical articles and information about Australian editing culture as well as the history of editing.  A newsletter is also published quarterly and distributed to members.

Awards 
ASE awards and accreditation nights are held annually in Sydney. Eligible members are presented with their ASE accreditation during this ceremony. The ASE Award itself is called an "Ellie" and resembles a small bronze Elephant with its trunk up and the winning film as a rubber stamp on the bottom. It is presented in the following eleven categories:

Short film
TV (factual)
TV (drama)
TV (comedy)
Documentary
Documentary (series)
Documentary (program)
Feature film
Commercials
Music Video
Open Content

The award for TV (comedy) is the most recent addition to the categories, having been added in 2014.

Best Editing in a Feature Film

Best Editing in a Documentary Feature 
2014: Once my Mother, Denise Haslem
2013: Show Me The Magic, Scott Walton
2012: Paul Kelly: Stories of Me, Sally Fryer
2011: Girls Own War Stories, Antoinette Ford
2010: My Asian Heart, Andrew Arestides
2009: A Good Man, Nicholas Beauman
2008: The Cars That Ate China, Andrew Arestides
2007: Choir of Hard Knocks, Steve Robinson
2006: Unfolding Florence, Nick Beauman

Best Editing in a Documentary Program 
2014: Cronulla Riots – The Day That Shocked the Nation, Melanie Annan
2013: Buckskin, David Banbury
2012: A Law Unto Himself, Andrea Lang

Best Editing in a Documentary Series 
2014: Kakadu – Ep 4, Caspar Mazzotti
2013: Desert War Ep 1, ‘Tobruk’, Lawrence Silvestrin
2012: Australian Story, ‘Streets with No Names’, Steven Baras-Miller

Best Editing in Television Drama 
2014: Redfern Now: Where the Heart Is, Nicholas Holmes
2013: Devil's Dust Part 2, Katrina Barker
2012: The Slap, Episode 1 ‘Hector’, Mark Atkin
2011: Spirited, Series 1, Episode 2, Martin Connor
2010: Packed to the Rafters, Episode 44, James Manche
2009: Underbelly: A Tale of Two Cities, Episode 4, Deborah Peart
2008: Underbelly, Episode 9, Peter Carrodus
2007: Bastard Boys, Veronika Jenet
2006: The Society Murders, Ken Sallows

Best Editing in a Television Comedy 
2014: The Moodys – Ep 1, Paul Swain

Best Editing in Television Factual 
2014: Taking on the Chocolate Frog – Ep 1, Marcos Moro
2013: Kings Cross ER, Series 2, Ep 1, Bob Burns
2012: Go Back To Where You Came From, Series 2, Episode 1, Orly Danon
2011: On Trial, Episode 1, Denise Haslem
2010: The Science of Teens, Episode 4: Moods, Fiona Strain
2009: Bondi Vet, Episode 12, Dave Redman
2008: Charlotte & Jordans Runway to LA, Episode 2, Philippa Rowlands
2007: Jamie's Kitchen, Australia, Episode 5, Philippa Rowlands

Best Editing in a Commercial 
2014: RACQ ‘Rescue Me’, Sue Schweikert
2013:  John West ‘Running with the Bears’, David Whittaker
2012: Volkswagen Tiguan ‘Cross Country’, Drew Thompson
2011: AB ‘3 Year Olds’, Bernard Garry
2010: ANZ ‘The Chase’, Peter Whitmore
2008: Toyota ‘Earth's Greatest 4WD’, Drew Thompson

Best Editing in a Music Video 
2014: Belle Roscoe ‘Let Me Cut in’, Scott Walmsley
2013: ‘Come into My Head’ Kimbra, John Gavin
2012: Angus Stone ‘Bird on the Buffalo’, Peter Barton
2011: Schvendes ‘Lay the Noose’, Matt Osborne
2010: The Thomas Oliver Band ‘Goin’ Home’, Katie Hinsen

Best Editing in a Short film

Best Editing in Open Content 
2014: Canon, Jessica Mutascio
2013: Fragments of Friday Ep 5, Ann Foo
2012: Event Zero, Episode 4, Julian Harvey

Accreditations 
2014: Karin Steininger
2013: Christopher Branagan, Deborah Peart

Lifetime Membership Award 
2014: Nicholas Beauman
2013: Mike Honey

See also 
American Cinema Editors

External links 
Official Website of the ASE

References 

Film editing awards
Film organisations in Australia
1996 establishments in Australia
Organizations established in 1996